The Stella Maris Church is a Roman Catholic parish church in the neighbourhood of Carrasco, Montevideo, Uruguay.

The edifice was built in 1918, designed by architect Rafael Ruano. It is dedicated to Our Lady, Star of the Sea, in allusion to the fact that Carrasco was a seaside resort when it was established at the beginning of the 20th century.

The parish was established on 24 February 1934. 

Several years ago a wooden image of a Christ Pantocrator was added to the main altar.

In the front yard can be seen an image of the Virgin of the Thirty-Three, patron saint of Uruguay.

References

External links

Carrasco, Montevideo

Roman Catholic churches completed in 1918
Roman Catholic church buildings in Montevideo
20th-century Roman Catholic church buildings in Uruguay